Krajíček (feminine Krajíčková) is a Czech and Slovak surname. Notable people with the surname include:

Austin Krajicek (born 1990), American tennis player, and a distant cousin of Richard
Jan Krajíček (born 1971), Czech ice hockey player
Lukáš Krajíček (born 1983), Czech ice hockey player
Michaëlla Krajicek, (born 1989), Dutch tennis player, and the younger half-sister of Richard Krajicek
Richard Krajicek (born 1971), Dutch tennis player

See also
 

Czech-language surnames
Slovak-language surnames